Gaffe à Lagaffe !, written and drawn by Franquin, is the fifteenth album of the original Gaston Lagaffe series.

Story

Inventions
petrol: special petrol for the Gastomobile, it also can cause unexpected fireworks
anti-hold-up system:  system which consists of spreading marbles to make robbers slide
radio-controlled iron: efficient iron, but not to be lost from sight, as it tends to fly away
heating for birds: system of pipes installed on the rooftop of Spirou editorial offices and connected to the heating system of the building
English divan: sofa made with elasticated plastic and buttons that tend to suddenly break loose, causing high damage

Background
This is the last album of the original Gaston Lagaffe series, and the first album published by Marsu Productions, who hold all the copyrights of Gaston Lagaffe. The album consists mostly of pages that haven't been published in albums, but were previously published in Spirou a long time ago. Only 13 new pages were published in this album, previously published in Spirou between 1986 and 1997. Roba and Cauvin have collaborated on one page.

References

 Gaston Lagaffe classic series on the official website
 Publication in Spirou  on bdoubliées.com.

External links
Official website 

1996 graphic novels
Comics by André Franquin